Tomás E. Nido Vicéns (born April 12, 1994) is a Puerto Rican professional baseball catcher for the New York Mets of Major League Baseball (MLB). He made his MLB debut in 2017.

Early life
Nido was born to two sport lineages that have represented Puerto Rico internationally. His mother is multi-sport athlete Liana Vicens, who competed as a swimmer in the 1968 Summer Olympics (at the age of 11), while his father, Tomás Nido Sr., won a medal in tennis at the 1982 Central American and Caribbean Games and played tennis at Louisiana State University. He is also the grandson of former member of the Puerto Rico national basketball team, Enrique Vicéns. The "Best Player in the World" of the 1959 FIBA World Championship Juan "Pachín" Vicéns is his great uncle. His uncles Michael Vicens and Miguel Nido were also professional athletes (in basketball and tennis respectively). Another, Carlos Nido, played tennis collegiately at Indiana University.

Nido was born in Guaynabo, Puerto Rico. He grew up in Puerto Rico and played baseball at the Puerto Rico High School Baseball Academy. While in high school he moved to Oviedo, Florida specifically to play his last two years of high school baseball in the continental United States and lived with the family of a teammate. When that teammate graduated, Nido's mother moved to Florida to live with him.

Career

Nido attended Orangewood Christian School in Maitland, Florida. He committed to attend Florida State University to play college baseball for the Florida State Seminoles. The New York Mets selected him in the eighth round of the 2012 Major League Baseball Draft. Rather than attend Florida State, Nido signed with the Mets, receiving a $250,000 signing bonus He made his professional debut with the Kingsport Mets of the Rookie-level Appalachian League. Nido played 2013 and 2014 with the Brooklyn Cyclones of the Class A-Short Season New York-Penn League and 2015 with the Savannah Sand Gnats of the Class A South Atlantic League. In 2016, he played for the St. Lucie Mets of the Class A-Advanced Florida State League, and won the league's batting title with a .320 average. The Mets added him to their 40-man roster after the 2016 season.

In 2017, Nido began the season with the Binghamton Rumble Ponies of the Class AA Eastern League. The Mets promoted Nido to the major leagues on September 12, 2017. He appeared in the All-Star Futures Game. He made his major league debut on September 13 against the Chicago Cubs at Wrigley Field and recorded his first hit the following day off of Félix Peña of the Cubs. After the regular season, he played for the Scottsdale Scorpions of the Arizona Fall League.

MLB.com ranked Nido as New York's 11th ranked prospect going into the 2018 season. He began the 2018 season with Binghamton. When Travis d'Arnaud tore his ulnar collateral ligament of the elbow on April 11, the Mets promoted Nido to the major leagues. In 2019, Nido slashed .191/.231/.316 with 4 home runs and 14 RBI in 50 games for the Mets.  Nido ended his 2020 season early due to a positive COVID-19 test and related complications that prevented him from returning. His final batting line read .292/.346/.583 with 2 home runs and 6 RBI on the year.

In 2021 he batted .222/.261/.327. In 2022 he batted .239/.276/.324, and tied for the major league lead in sacrifice hits with 12. On October 20, 2022, Nido was named one of three finalists for the National League Gold Glove Award for catchers.

References

External links

1994 births
Living people
People from Guaynabo, Puerto Rico
Major League Baseball players from Puerto Rico
Baseball players from Florida
Major League Baseball catchers
New York Mets players
Kingsport Mets players
Brooklyn Cyclones players
Savannah Sand Gnats players
St. Lucie Mets players
Binghamton Rumble Ponies players
Scottsdale Scorpions players
Criollos de Caguas players
Indios de Mayagüez players
Las Vegas 51s players
Syracuse Mets players